is one of five neighborhoods within the city of Date, Fukushima, along with the former towns of Date, Hobara, Ryozen, and Yanagawa. Until the merger in 2006 it was a town located in Date District, Fukushima Prefecture, Japan.

As of 2003, the town had an estimated population of 4,443, and a density of 101.83 persons per km². The total area is 43.63 km².

Tsukidate is primarily known for rice and wasabi cultivation. It is host to a hydrangea festival in Spring.

History 

The town symbol was established in 1965. It includes a representation of the kanji "tsuki" (月), with the horizontal lines extended to indicate unlimited progress. In 1985, the golden-rayed lily, Japanese zelkova, and Japanese bush warbler were named the town's official flower, tree, and bird, respectively.

On January 1, 2006, Tsukidate, along with the towns of Date, Hobara, Ryōzen and Yanagawa (all from Date District), was merged to create Date City.

Local attractions 

 Hana Koubo (resort and bathhouse)
 16 Rakan Statues
 Tsukimidate Forest Park

International relations 
Since 1994, Tsukidate has been involved in a cultural exchange program with students from Revere, Massachusetts. Every two years, students from Tsukidate travel to the US for a week-long home-stay. On alternate years, those same students from Revere visit Tsukidate and stay in the student's homes. This program was expanded to include all of Date City in 2006. In the summer of 2016, Date City and Revere City became sister cities. The program has been on hiatus since 2017.

References

External links
Date official website in Japanese

Dissolved municipalities of Fukushima Prefecture
Date, Fukushima